is a Catholic private women's college in Nagano, Nagano, Japan. The predecessor of the school was founded in 1961, and it was chartered as a university in 2003.

The college offers a 4-year degree in the Faculty of Human Studies, as well as 2-year degrees in either the Department of Early Childhood Education or the Department of International Communication.

Since 2016, it has proposed to open a new campus next to the east exit of Nagano Station with a new nursing major. Construction on the new campus began in April 2018.

References

External links
 Official website 

Educational institutions established in 1961
Private universities and colleges in Japan
Universities and colleges in Nagano Prefecture
1961 establishments in Japan
Japanese junior colleges
Nagano (city)
Catholic universities and colleges in Japan
Women's universities and colleges in Japan